Chris Shepherd (born 11 December 1967) is a double BAFTA nominated television/film writer and director. Born in Anfield, Liverpool, Lancashire, in 1967. He is mainly known for combining live action with animation. His work fuses comedy with commentary on the darker side of human nature.

Early years
Shepherd's first animation was made in 1989 and it was called Safari. He wanted to make a drama but didn't know any actors, so he made his cast out of plasticine. Using this film he won a place at University for the Creative Arts, Farnham. His first job in the industry was as production manager at Speedy Films which was the creative vehicle for director Paul Vester. His writing and commissioned directorial debut came in 1997 with a Channel 4 film called The Broken Jaw. This animated comedy illustrated the plight of a public house after it has been transformed into a fun pub. During the same year he animated the world stare-out championship for BBC comedy sketch show Big Train.

As well as being the producer on the Channel 4/MOMI scheme, he also worked as producer with Cramp Twins creator, Brian Wood, on his Channel 4 film School Disco and "Bunny Schendler" on her BAFTA nominated "World of Interiors".

Slinky
In 2000 Shepherd set up Slinky Pictures and until its closure in 2010, the company produced many award-winning films and adverts. His 2003 Dad's Dead, commissioned by animate!, featured Ian Hart as its narrator. This was the first collaboration of many with producer and Slinky Pictures co-founder Maria Manton. The film groundbreakingly combined animation with live action in a unique style which led the film to win 25 international awards including Best Short Film at the British Independent Film Awards and BAFTA nomination. He directed and co-wrote a spoof general election series with Peter Holmes called People's Britain for Channel 4 in 2001.

Other credits include animation on Channel 4 sitcom Nathan Barley and Channel 4 documentary Bollocks to Cancer. 2005 saw him co-write and co-direct with artist David Shrigley on a second animate! commission called Who I Am And What I Want. The year after Silence Is Golden won the TCM Classic Shorts Award at the 2006 London Film Festival.

It was during this period that Shepherd  wrote several feature films including: Up in Heaven, Directed by Shepherd, produced by Nira Park and Maria Manton for Film4, Big Talk Productions; and 50% Off, directed by Shepherd from an idea by him and David Shrigley for Warp Films. After being caught for five years in the development of Up in Heaven, he vowed to make as many films as he could, regardless of length. There's still a lot of speculation about the progress of his feature film projects which, according to several websites, are still in development.

His last Slinky film, Bad Night for the Blues, won the International Canal+ Award at Clermont-Ferrand International Short Film Festival and was transmitted on BBC HD on 27 February 2011. This is the first film in which Shepherd adopted an autobiographical approach without hiding characters involved.

Post Slinky and Random Acts 2011 to 2016
Shepherd's first work after Slinky was a pop promo, Falling into Pieces, for Black Casino and the Ghost. From 2011 saw Shepherd being a guest curator on Channel 4's late night arts strand Random Acts. Commissioned by Lupus films he's worked with the likes of David Shrigley, Phil Mulloy and Fred Deakin. As well as curating and producing sixty films for the strand he's also directed two. A recreation of a childhood visits to the dentist called "Drillerfiller" and a pop promo for protest singer Grace Petrie called "Grace Petrie: Rise". Both look at Shepherd's childhood landscape, the first as a memory and the second as a documentary. "Rise" was shot in Anfield in Liverpool just as Shepherd's childhood neighbourhood was being demolished. The film was later included in 2012's Anfield Home Tours as part of the 2up2down project. He also produced a documentary project with Tim Brunsden called Home Sweet Home which documented events after a major fire at Shepherd's family home.

In 2013 Shepherd wrote and directed a new film called The Ringer. Commissioned by Canal+ and CNC is a coproduction with Polkadot Productions, Autour De Minuit and the Bureau. It stars Kieran Lynn and John Henshaw. The Ringer saw Shepherd develop his autobiographical approach to his filmmaking, thus led to critical praise and the film winning many film awards. Shepherd revealed in 2018 that the film was inspired by when he met is estranged father Andy Fletcher. He created the film as both an examination of the events and a tribute to his father. The film is dedicated to his father as on the end credits it says "for my Dad". Andy Fletcher died on 19 September 2018. Also in 2013 saw Shepherd collaborate with Robert Popper called Anatole's Island which was voiced by Peter Serafinowicz and Shepherd directed a series of Comedy Blaps! for Channel 4 with the comedy collective the Alternative Comedy Memorial Society. Pop promo collaborations followed with the likes of Holly Johnson, Kurt Wagner, Reverend and The Makers , Lambchop members new electronic band HeCTA and The Wave Pictures.

2016 saw Shepherd return with another director/writer project for Arte called Johnno's Dead a loose sequel to his 2003 classic Dad's Dead. This sequel is set thirteen years after the original was set and starts the same cast. The film has played many international festivals such as Annecy, Clermont Ferrand, Tampere and the film picked up Best British Short Film at the London International Animation Festival held in the Barbican in London.

Joe Orton
In 2017 Shepherd embarked upon a Joe Orton tribute project to mark the 50th anniversary of the passing of the playwright. The project was masterminded by Shepherd with Doctor Emma Parker from the University of Leicester. It centres around Orton's Edna Welthorpe letters. Orton wrote prank letters of complaint to poke fun at establishment figures such as vicars, companies and sometimes even his own plays. The project funded by the Arts Council England and the University of Leicester has seen many comedy writers such as Alec Baldwin, David Quantick, Caroline Moran, Phil Bowker, Arthur Mathews, Jesse Armstrong write new Edna Welthorpe letters. These letters are to be read in two events. The first in Latitude with readings by Robin Ince, John-Luke Roberts and Joe Orton's sister Leonine Orton Barnet. The second is at the Little Theatre in Orton's hometown on the anniversary of Orton's death on 9 August 2017. With readings by Leonie Orton, Frances Barber, David Quantick and John Shuttleworth. In addition Shepherd has directed a short animated film called Yours Faithfully Edna Welthorpe (Mrs) which features the voices of Alison Steadman and Robin Sebastian.

Current work
Shepherd directed a short film for Arte France with regular collaborators Autour De Minuit called Brexicuted which premiered in Edinburgh Film Festival on 27 June 2018. and a feature film which he is attached to direct written by David Quantick. In 2020 he created animations for Sara Pascoe's sitcom with illustrator  Stephen Collins for BBC 2 called Out Of Her Mind. Since lockdown Shepherd has frequently mentioned that he’s writing a graphic novel called Anfield Road.

Filmography

References

Sources 
 Chris Shepherd at IMDb

1966 births
Living people
Alumni of the University for the Creative Arts
English dramatists and playwrights
English animators
English film directors
British animated film directors
English male dramatists and playwrights